McKelway is a surname. Notable people with the surname include:

Alexander McKelway (1866–1918), American clergyman, journalist, and activist
Doug McKelway (born 1954), American television journalist
St. Clair McKelway (1905–1980), American journalist and editor

See also
Kelway